Tsvetelina Abrasheva (born 27 May 1977) is a Bulgarian former competitive figure skater. Having started skating at age three, she represented Bulgaria at the 1994 Winter Olympics, placing 24th, and won the silver medal at the 1996 Ondrej Nepela Memorial. After tearing cruciate ligaments in the knee, she struggled to recover and retired from competition. 

Abrasheva married a journalist who played hockey in around 2000 and had a child two years later. She became a sports journalist for Bulgarian National Television in around 2002 or 2003 and began commentating Olympic events in 2006.

Results

References 

1977 births
Bulgarian female single skaters
Living people
Figure skaters from Sofia
Figure skaters at the 1994 Winter Olympics
Olympic figure skaters of Bulgaria